Christof Babatz (born 3 September 1974) is a former German professional footballer who played as a midfielder.

Career
Babatz was born in Hanover. He played for TSV Schulenburg, SV Germania Grasdorf, Hannover 96, and Hamburger SV. In 2000, he transferred to 1. FSV Mainz 05, and stayed with them for five seasons, helping them reach the Bundesliga. In 2007, Babatz moved to TuS Koblenz, playing only six games before finishing his career with SV Waldhof Mannheim.

References

External links
 

1974 births
Living people
German footballers
Germany youth international footballers
Bundesliga players
2. Bundesliga players
Association football midfielders
Hannover 96 players
Hannover 96 II players
Hamburger SV players
Hamburger SV II players
1. FSV Mainz 05 players
TuS Koblenz players
SV Waldhof Mannheim players
Footballers from Hanover